Odukkam Thudakkam is a 1982 Indian Malayalam-language film, directed by Malayattoor Ramakrishnan and produced by M. O. Joseph. The film stars Ratheesh, Kalaranjini, Rajkumar and K. P. Ummer in the lead roles. The film has a musical score by G. Devarajan.

Cast
Ratheesh
Kalaranjini
Rajkumar
K. P. Ummer
Nanditha Bose

Soundtrack
The music was composed by G. Devarajan with lyrics by Malayattoor Ramakrishnan, P. Bhaskaran and Pulamaipithan.

References

External links
 

1982 films
1980s Malayalam-language films